This is a list of the longest running U.S. first-run syndicated television series, ordered by number of broadcast seasons.

To qualify for this list, the programming must originate in North America, shown nationally in the United States, and be first-run syndicated (as opposed to previously aired material, repackaging of previously aired material, or material released in other media). For the purposes of this list, series that were available only on a local or regional basis will be excluded. For series that were presented on U.S. broadcast networks or cable networks at other points in their runs, only the amount aired nationally as original first-run syndicated programming is represented here.

Several long-lasting series were both in first-run syndication and on U.S. network television. For those that were in syndication for fewer than ten seasons, see List of longest-running United States television series.

List

25 seasons and up

15–24 seasons

10–14 seasons

See also
List of sitcoms broadcast in first-run syndication
List of television programs by episode count
List of television series canceled after one episode
List of television series canceled before airing an episode
List of longest-running U.S. cable television series
List of longest-running U.S. broadcast network television series
List of longest-running U.S. primetime television series
List of longest-running United States television series

Notes

Longest-running syndicated
Syndicated
US first run syndicated